Here are the list of Captain Barbell (2006) episodes.

Weekly Episode Guide

Week 01: IN THE BEGINNING
May 29 – June 2, 2006
In a distant future, a time machine hurtles through space. It lands on Earth in the year 1992. Inside are the wife and son of Captain B. Sending them away seems to be the only way to protect them from the clutches of the evil General. Lolo Aloy and Lola Melay find the time machine with the young Arell still inside. They decide to hold on to the child, naming him Teng. As time goes on, Teng grows in strength. Only Lolo Aloy is aware of how super human his new charge is. Teng uses his strength to come to the aid of Leah, who becomes his good friend. Conversely, Clarisse grows further apart from Teng, blaming him for stealing their Lolo's affections from her. Worst of all, Leah gives Teng the bad news that she must leave for the United States. Still, despite the setbacks, Teng grows into a happy young boy. He has his best friends Kit and Bobby. He has the love and tutelage of Lola Melay and Lolo Aloy. Little does he know that his life is fraught with danger and that behind every shadow lurks a possible enemy. But a discovery in a junkyard changes Teng's life forever.

Week 02: BIRTH OF A NEW SUPERHERO
June 5–9, 2006
Captain Barbell discovers that he has more powers than just superhuman strength. He uses them to the best of his abilities in his first public appearance – to rescue Cesar, Sandra and Melay from the falling bridge. Everyone wonders who this hero could be. Captain Barbell wonders if he can protect his true identity from the rest of the world, and will he be able to tackle the new responsibilities of being a superhero.

Week 03: PUTAKTI'S VENOM
June 12–16, 2006
Captain Barbell runs to Leah's rescue, only to be attacked by Jared, who has transformed into Putakti - a monstrous wasp. He fails to rescue Leah after the wasp's venom gets into his eye, disabling him to transform again into his superhuman form. When Kit tells her father that Jared might really be the wasp, Joe goes to Jared's house to investigate, where he ultimately discover the truth. Captain Barbell and Putakti battle it out once again, and Jared switches back to his human form after Captain Barbell throws him into a river. When Levi sees the helpless Jared, he beats him to a pulp.

Week 04: TETANO AND ADOBE
June 19–23, 2006
Levi is released from prison with the help of his father. Viel investigates who is trying to kill his son. Kit and Bobby bring their mysterious new friend "Blanca" to the hospital, only to find out that she is completely well except for her memory loss. Blanca eventually gets to know Sandra and Cesar. Barbara comes to the rescue during Captain Barbell's battle with Tetano. She brings Teng to her home, where Teng witnesses Borris's extraordinary strength. He begins to wonder if there are others like him. When Teng retrieves the barbell he used to defeat Tetano, he discovers that it has been drained of its powers. Meanwhile, a new villain, Adobe, emerges from the depths of Viel's technopark. It ruins Teng's chances of finding out what really happened to his Lolo Aloy.

Week 05: ALTER-EGOS
June 26–30, 2006
Bobby realizes that Teng is Captain Barbell. But Teng can rest easy because Bobby decides to keep his new discovery a secret. Meanwhile, Viel asks Barbara if she has regained her memory. Barbara lies to Viel saying she still doesn’t remember anything. She can not remember everything exactly but she is sure that she must be someone else. She vows to find out who she really is, as well as who the person in her dreams was. The evil apple doesn’t fall far from the tree as Levi attempts to strong-arm Teng into selling the land. His failure only fuels his father's anger. Boris tries to get on Viel's good side by stealing the land title from Teng, except that Teng catches him in the act. This leads to Teng meeting Barbara. As the two bond, the young hero begins to feel more and more at home with this woman. And then Viel falls sick. Dexter tells Viel that Boris’ blood is no longer enough to bring him back to normal.

Week 06: VIEL'S SECRET
July 3–7, 2006
Viel's condition worsens and not even a blood transfusion from Boris can help. He continues to keep this secret from Barbara and Levi. When Levi sees him helpless in Boris’ arms, Viel has no ready explanation. This forces both Barbara and Levi to go on separate fact-finding missions. They begin sharing information. But Barbara finds out much more than she was looking for. Meanwhile, Kit interviews Bubog, who is back as Narciso. He discovers through Kit that it is because of Captain Barbell that he is now Bubog. He vows revenge.

Week 07: AEROBIKA'S REVENGE
July 10–14, 2006
Everyone's head over heels for the hot new physical education teacher in school, Ms. Eros. Little do they know that Ms. Eros was once the obese Ms. Patti who was teased as “Aero Biik.” Her transformation is due to the slimming tea she discovered from a plant contaminated with barbanium. She started the slimming hype in school to help out people like her who have been consistently teased about being overweight. She also uses her new power as a way of seeking revenge on people who have been mean to her in the past. Even Bobby joins the bandwagon. Ms. Eros becomes Aerobika, the super being who is obsessed with making everyone sexy – and addicted to her slimming tea! Meanwhile, Viel becomes even more powerful with Dexter's new discovery, the crystal acid. Being the scheming villain that he is, Viel uses this for his evil plans. Levi and Clarisse's friendship grows more each day.

Week 08: DATE WITH CAPTAIN BARBELL
July 17–21, 2006
Levi and Teng's friendship gets back on track when Levi saves Teng from drowning in the river contaminated with crystal acid. Aerobika is already running out of leaves for her slimming tea, but she still threatens the police that she will do something disastrous unless they give her a chance to date Captain Barbell. Captain Barbell obliges, but the only problem is his date with Aerobika coincides with Teng's date with Leah. Meanwhile, Viel discovers more uses for his crystal acid, which are all potential threats to the community.

Week 09: CONSEQUENCES AND CONFESSIONS
July 24–28, 2006
With the help of Viel's breakthrough experiments, Mayor Lazaro is able to resurrect his wife Myra. Although Leah and Lazaro are overjoyed to have Myra back, Agnes is suspicious of Myra's return, especially since she seems like a different person this time around. 
A new villain Marvin, who has been named “Vaporo” by the police for his exemplary stealing strategy (nobody notices him because he turns into vapor), is on the loose. Marvin got his powers from a contaminated shooting star that fell into the river that he was in. Marvin has a crush on Kit but Kit tell him she doesn't have any feelings for him but for Teng and this forces Marvin/Vaporo to bring Kit to the Lighthouse. Two people will finally have the guts to confess their feelings to their special someone.

Week 10: JARED RETURNS
July 31 – August 4, 2006,
Kit tries to ignore Teng after confessing her feelings for him, while Levi fights for Clarisse despite his father's disapproval. Jared makes a comeback, and he is able to make Leah believe that he is innocent. Leah suddenly becomes secretive after promising Jared that she will help him out. Captain Barbell battles with Jared once more.

Week 11: CLARISSE'S MISSION
August 7–11, 2006
The General assigns a mission to Clarisse's alter ego, Ex-o. She has to find and kill Arell. Ex-o's powers will soon take over Clarisse's body, even when she is not sleepwalking. Kit tries her best to be happy for Teng, and she patches up her friendship with him when her screenplay is chosen to be featured in school. But the problem arises when Teng and Leah audition and grab the lead roles. Meanwhile, Cyborg 5566 attacks Marravelos.

Week 12: CAPTAIN BARBELL IS SICK
August 14–18, 2006
Captain Barbell falls from the sky, significantly weakened from his face-off with Ex-o. Upon seeing him so helpless, Kit and Bobby rush the superhero to the hospital. Meanwhile, Boris discovers his father's mysterious illness, and how Viel has been using his blood to get better. Viel tells his son that all they need is Captain Barbell for him to be well again. The evil duo takes advantage of Captain Barbell's confinement to capture him. Lola Melay comes to the rescue when she finds out that Captain Barbell is in the hospital. Apparently, she has known all along that Teng and Captain Barbell are the same.

Week 13: EX-O'S BATTLE
August 21–25, 2006
Sandra and Cesar find out about Clarisse's alter ego, Ex-O. Captain Barbell promises them that he will not harm their daughter when he fights Ex-O. Teng also realizes that his weakness is Askobar, but he discovers that he becomes immune to it when it's contained in glass. The aerial battle between Ex-O and Captain B ends in tragedy. Levi devastated with the death of Clarisse, and vows revenge against Captain Barbell.

Week 14: BLACK-OUT, A NEW HERO
August 28 – September 1, 2006,
Teng has decided to leave his superhero days behind. He is instantly replaced by “Blackout,” the newest crime-busting hero in Maravelos. Blackout, who used to be Ruben, got his powers through electricity, which enables him to do everything that Captain B used to do – even fly! He also has another edge: he's not weakened by Askobar. After witnessing the public's clamor for Blackout, Teng cannot help but think twice about the drastic decision he made. Meanwhile, Mayor Lazaro gives to Viel the Magtanggol's land title, in exchange for Myra's resurrection. But the mayor doesn’t know that Myra is planning something evil for him and Leah. With this new development, can Teng save Leah without his alter ego Captain Barbell's breast plate?

Week 15: A SUPERHERO'S DESTINY
September 4–8, 2006
In an attempt to avenge Jennifer's death, Ruben murders the killer, Leon, and he ends up in prison. Viel takes advantage of Ruben's imprisonment by bribing him with the opportunity to be “Blackout” again. But what the Villains really want is for Captain Barbell to return to Maravelos so they could capture him. As planned, Blackout gatecrashes a party organized by Boris so Captain Barbell will realize that he's still needed in Maravelos. Teng soon realizes that he has to do something about Blackout. With the help of his friends, he retrieves Captain Barbell's breast plate from the place where they buried it. A face-off between Captain B and a fully charged (from the town's power plant) Blackout will ensues.

Week 16: AMORSECO'S LOVE
September 11–15, 2006

Week 17: MB, THE MASKED BANDIT
September 18–22, 2006
With Bobby's help, Teng transforms into Captain Barbell and manages to make things right once again in Maravelos. He conjures a mighty whirlwind to suck all the amorseco spuds that affected the townspeople. When things get back to normal, Joe confesses to Lady Amor that he still loves her, while Teng and Leah decide to split up for the meantime. Meanwhile, Levi becomes Leah's confidante. But a masked bandit with the letters “MB” on his breastplate soon attacks Viel's properties. MB also tells Captain Barbell that he is not the enemy.

Week 18: COACH DRIBBLE AND THE ASKOBOYS
September 25–29, 2006
Captain Barbell fails to prevent the assassination of Mayor Lazaro, and Teng is devastated with Leah's situation. Leah returns the Magtanggol land title to Teng and tells him that they’re even. Apparently, she's still bitter about what happened between them. Meanwhile, Ms. Florendo announces that Marravelos Academy is about to be closed down because Viel pulled out his financial aid for the school. When the school rallies against Viel, he poses a condition that could possibly change his mind: Marravelos Academy (M.A.) needs to win over Marravelos University (M.U.) in a basketball game. But the players of M.A. are no match for the players of M.U., who have been drugged by the strength-inducing askobar steroids by Coach Dribble.

Week 19: MB SAVES CAPTAIN BARBELL
October 2–6, 2006
With Captain Barbell's help, Marravelos Academy wins over Marravelos University. But instead of celebrating, Bobby and Lola Melay are left worried sick because Captain Barbell suddenly disappears after the game. It was no other than Viel who captured him, and Levi takes advantage of the opportunity to beat up Captain Barbell with special Askobar knuckle bars. But just when he's about to stab the superhero with a slab of Askobar, the Maskaradong Bandido suddenly appears. A new villain is sent in by the General – the cyborg Magnetika whose goal is to accomplished the failed plan of Ex-O. Kit will ultimately discover that Captain Barbell has been Teng all along.

Week 20: MAGNETIKA'S FORCES
October 9–13, 2006
Kit gets mad at both Captain Barbell and Bobby when he sees Captain Barbell kissing Magnetika in the barn. Outside the barn Joe and Cesar are also at odds over Magna. Aurora wonders why neither of the two want to remove the rings that Magna gave them. She does not yet realize that it is through these rings that Magna is controlling Joe and Cesar. But an investigation leads Kit and Aurora to the truth about Magna – and Magnetika. Now that her cover is blown, she demands to see Captain Barbell again. Or else she will continue to wreak her havoc on the men of the town. She feeds on the life essence of the men, making them younger and younger until they just disappear. One of her victims is Bobby, and so Teng must become Captain Barbell to once again face the nasty villainess. Meanwhile, Dexter betrays Viel when he discovers a way to make the time vessel work. But Viel finds out and decides to punish Dexter, however something goes terribly wrong. Then Magnetika meets Viel and the two trade secrets. Magnetika gives Viel an offer he can not refuse.

Week 21: THE TRUTH ABOUT BORIS
October 16–20, 2006
Viel confirms his suspicions that Barbara is the Maskaradong Bandido. He and Magnetika make plans to avoid her. He asks Magnetika if she knows where Boris could be. He has to find Boris before Boris finds out the truth behind his real parents. Or worse, the truth of Boris’ brother actually is. Meanwhile, Barbra tells her tales of her life as the masked bandit. She takes Teng to her fortress and decides it is time for Teng to know everything about his past. She also confides that she believes Captain B is still alive. She wants to take Teng in the time vessel to look for Captain B. But she tells him that with or without him, she plans to leave the present and go back to the future. Before she can get her plans underway, a terrible confrontation happens. Torn and unable to decide what (and who) to believe in, Boris is driven over the edge.

Week 22: CAPTAIN B'S EVIL WAYS
October 23–27, 2006
The relationship between Levi and Leah gets complicated as she unintentionally expresses her true feelings for Teng. Levi gets more jealous of Teng. Viel, meanwhile, realizes that he needs Captain Barbell to be able to walk again. After Magna shares what she knows about the superhero, Viel and Levi become suspicious that Teng and Captain Barbell are one and the same. Captain B is sent by the General to present-day Marravelos. His mission, now that his brain has been re-programmed by the General, will put Captain Barbell against his own father. Teng and his classmates are put in danger by their new teacher. Can Teng transform into Captain Barbell and save his friends, despite Levi's presence?

Week 23: SECRETS REVEALED 
October 30 – November 3, 2006

Week 24: THE IMPOSTOR 
November 6–10, 2006

Week 25: SACRIFICES 
November 13–17, 2006

Week 26: TO MAKE IT RIGHT 
November 20–24, 2006

Week 27: THE VILLAIN VILLAINS 
November 27 – December 1, 2006

Week 28: THE GAME OF LOVE 
December 4–8, 2006

Week 29: THE FUTURE GENERAL 
December 11–15, 2006

Week 30: THE END OF TEARS 
December 18–22, 2006

Week 31: LOOKING BACK 
December 25–29, 2006

Week 32: CHANGE OF TIME 
January 1–5, 2007

Week 33: DEPARTURES 
January 8–12, 2007

See also
GMA Network
Telefantasya
Captain Barbell

External links

GMA Network's Official Captain Barbell Site
Captain Barbell Blog Site
Captain Barbell on Pinoy Exchange, leading Captain Barbell Fan's Forum
Captain Barbell on Picturetrail, comprehensive Captain Barbell TV Series Gallery''

Captain Barbell
Lists of fantasy television series episodes
Lists of Philippine drama television series episodes

tl:Captain Barbell